The London and North Eastern Railway (LNER) operated different types of electric multiple units.

British Rail Class 306, introduced in 1949 on the suburban lines out of London Liverpool Street
British Rail Class 505, introduced in 1931, jointly with the London, Midland and Scottish Railway, in the Manchester area
British Rail Class 506, introduced in 1954 in the Manchester area
LNER Tyneside electric units, introduced in 1937 in Tyneside
London Underground 1938 Stock, 289 cars of which were LNER property
NER electric units, absorbed from the North Eastern Railway in 1923